Voltage DC is the eponymous second studio album by Puerto Rican reggaeton performer Voltio, released on December 27, 2005, by Sony BMG and White Lion.

Release and success
Released roughly a year after his first solo album Voltage AC, Voltio charted and sold well, partly due to the successful single "Chulin Culin Chunfly", a collaboration with famous reggaeton performer Residente of Calle 13. It sold 4,020 copies in its first week, debuting at number twenty on the Billboard Latin Albums chart.

Track listing
 "Intro" — 3:05
 "Chulin Culin Chunfly" (featuring Calle 13) (Padilla, E. F./Perez, R./Ramos, J.) — 4:35
 "Chévere" (featuring Notch) (Howell, N./Masis, M. E./Ramos, J.) — 3:45
 "Dame de Eso" (Masis, M. E./Ramos, J.) — 3:26
 "No Vamos a Parar" (featuring Zion) (Harper R. Michael/Ortiz, F./Ramos, J.) — 3:42
 "La Culebra" (Ramos, J./Sanchez, A.) — 3:11
 "Maleante de Cartón" (Ramos, J../Rivera, L. A. Santiago) — 4:18
 "Bombón" (Masis, M. E./Ramos, J.) — 3:09
 "Julito Maraña" (featuring Tego Calderón) (Ortiz, J./Ramos, J./Rodoriguez, A.) — 3:24
 "Matando la Liga" (Colón, G. A./Ramos, J.) — 3:21
 "Bumper" (Perez, A./Ramos, J.) — 3:32
 "Un Dedo" (Ramos, J.) — 3:39
 "Voltio" (featuring Maestro) (Ramos, J./Rodriguez, A.) — 3:51
 "Chulin Culin Chunfly (The Rattlesnake Song)" (featuring Calle 13 and Three 6 Mafia) (Beauregard, P./Houston, J./Padilla, E. F./Ramos, J.) — 3:41

Chart performance
Released in 2005, at a time that reggaeton was making a major breakthrough into the mainstream audience, the album charted well, peaking in the top 20 at number 17 on the United States Billboard Top Latin Albums chart and at number 15 on the Top Heatseekers chart. The album was also successful enough to cross genres and to chart on the Top R&B/Hip-Hop Albums chart, peaking at number 98.

Chart positions

References

Julio Voltio albums
2005 albums
Albums produced by Luny Tunes